The Wernher Baronetcy of Luton Hoo Park in the Parish of Luton, Bedford, was a title in the Baronetage of the United Kingdom. It was created on 2 August 1905 for the German-born Randlord and art collector Julius Wernher. His younger son, the third Baronet (who succeeded his elder brother), was a major general in the British Army. The title became extinct on his death in 1973.

The family seat was Luton Hoo.

Wernher baronets, of Luton Hoo (1905)
Sir Julius Charles Wernher, 1st Baronet (1850–1912)
Sir Derrick Wernher, 2nd Baronet (1889–1948)
Sir Harold Wernher, 3rd Baronet (1893–1973)

Arms

References

Extinct baronetcies in the Baronetage of the United Kingdom